Catocala maso is a moth in the family Erebidae. It is found in China (Guangdong).

References

maso
Moths described in 2011
Moths of Asia